No. 103 Squadron was a Royal Air Force bomber squadron during World War I, World War II and the Cold War, switching to helicopters in the late 1950s until it was disbanded for the last time in 1975.

History

Formation in World War I

No. 103 Squadron was formed during the Great War as No. 103 Squadron, RFC at RAF Beaulieu, Hampshire on 1 September 1917, equipped with Airco DH.9 aircraft.

In May 1918 the Squadron was transferred to France and flew reconnaissance and day bombing operations on the Western Front. That June, following the foundation of the Royal Air Force, the squadron became part of No. 80 Wing RAF. The Squadron was disbanded on 1 October 1919 at RAF Shotwick, Flintshire.

Reformation
The Squadron was reformed on 10 August 1936 at RAF Andover, Hampshire as No. 103 (Bomber) Squadron, a light bomber Squadron flying biplane Hawker Hind bombers. The Squadron was then posted to RAF Usworth in County Durham. In July 1938 103 Squadron was re-equipped with the more advanced Fairey Battle monoplane bomber.

World War II

At the outbreak of the Second World War the Squadron was deployed to France as part of the RAF Advanced Air Striking Force. On 10 May 1940 the Luftwaffe and the German Army invaded France, Belgium and the Netherlands. The Squadron was heavily committed during the Battle of France, sustaining many losses. In mid June 1940 the Squadron withdrew from France for RAF Abingdon in England.
103 Squadron was then transferred to RAF Newton near Nottingham and reverted to the control of No. 1 Group RAF, Bomber Command. In October 1940 it was re-equipped with Vickers Wellington bombers. Operations were carried out with this type on targets on mainland Europe. The Squadron moved into the new airfield at RAF Elsham Wolds in July 1941. In July 1942 the Wellingtons were replaced by Handley Page Halifax bombers. These were in turn replaced in late October 1942 by Avro Lancaster bombers, which 103 Squadron flew on many operations to Germany and occupied Europe for the rest of the war. During the Second World War 103 Squadron flew over 6000 operational sorties, at a high cost in both men and machines. On February 14, 1943, the Squadron was sent to bomb the city of Milan in Northern Italy, but the bomber leading the formation was hit by incendiary bombs dropped from another Lancaster over the target and crashed in the southern outskirts of the city. Some parts of the bomber were discovered in 1990 during the extension of the Milan Metro. At the conclusion of the Second World War, on 26 November 1945, the Squadron was disbanded by renumbering it to 57 Squadron.

On jet bombers in RAF Germany
103 Squadron was subsequently reformed at RAF Gütersloh, West Germany on 30 November 1954 and was part of the 2nd Tactical Air Force. During this short period the unit flew the English Electric Canberra bomber. The Squadron was however again disbanded on 1 August 1956.

On helicopters in Cyprus
103 Squadron reformed at RAF Nicosia, Cyprus on 1 August 1959 after renumbering of 284 Squadron. From then onwards it became a support unit with Bristol Sycamore HR.14 helicopters operating in search and rescue, casualty evacuation and internal security roles. 103 Squadron was disbanded on 31 July 1963 by breaking the squadron up into Nos. 1563 (at Nicosia) and 1564 (at El Adem) flights.

In the Far East
103 Squadron itself was reformed in the Far East at RAF Seletar, Singapore on 1 August 1963 by renumbering 110 Squadron. At that time it was equipped with Westland Whirlwind HAR.10 helicopters. In 1969 the Squadron was posted to RAF Changi and subsequently moved to RAF Tengah in 1971. In November 1972 the Westland Whirlwind was replaced with the more modern and capable Westland Wessex helicopter, but three years later 103 Squadron was disbanded for the last time, on 1 August 1975 at RAF Tengah.

Aircraft operated

Squadron bases

References
Notes

Bibliography

 Bowyer, Michael J.F. and John D.R. Rawlings. Squadron Codes, 1937-56. Cambridge, UK: Patrick Stephens Ltd., 1979. .
 Charlwood, Don. No Moon Tonight. London: Goodall Publications Ltd., 1984. .
 Finn, Sid. Black Swan: A History of 103 Squadron RAF. Newton Publishers, 1989. .
 Flintham, Vic and Andrew Thomas. Combat Codes: A full explanation and listing of British, Commonwealth and Allied air force unit codes since 1938. Shrewsbury, Shropshire, UK: Airlife Publishing Ltd., 2003. .
 Halley, James J. The Squadrons of the Royal Air Force & Commonwealth 1918-1988. Tonbridge, Kent, UK: Air Britain (Historians) Ltd., 1988. .
 Jefford, C.G. RAF Squadrons, a Comprehensive record of the Movement and Equipment of all RAF Squadrons and their Antecedents since 1912. Shrewsbury, Shropshire, UK: Airlife Publishing, 1988 (second edition 2001). .
 Moyes, Philip J.R. Bomber Squadrons of the RAF and their Aircraft. London: Macdonald and Jane's (Publishers) Ltd., 2nd edition 1976. .
 Public Record Office AIR 27 103 Squadron files.
 Rawlings, John D.R. Coastal, Support and Special Squadrons of the RAF and their Aircraft. London: Jane's Publishing Company Ltd., 1982. .

External links

 Squadron history on RAF site
 History of No.'s 101–105 Squadrons at RAF Web
 A brief history of No. 103 Squadron RFC 1917-1918
 History of 103 Squadron RAF 1917 - 1975
 RAF Elsham Wolds North Lincolnshire Airfield

Royal Flying Corps squadrons
Royal Air Force aircraft squadrons
Military units and formations established in 1917
Military units and formations of the Royal Air Force in World War I
Aircraft squadrons of the Royal Air Force in World War II
1917 establishments in the United Kingdom